Coleophora burhinella is a moth of the family Coleophoridae. It is found on the island of Honshu in Japan.

The wingspan is about 10.5 mm.

References

burhinella
Moths described in 1990
Moths of Japan